Catch a Rising Star is the debut album from singer John Gary, released in 1963 on the RCA Victor label. The album spent over a year on the Billboard record chart.

Track listing

Side one
 "This Is All I Ask" (Gordon Jenkins)
 "My Kind of Girl" (Leslie Bricusse)
 "Once Upon a Time" (Charles Strouse, Lee Adams)
 "Till the Birds Sing in the Morning" (Will Holt)
 "Your Cheatin' Heart" (Hank Williams)
 "Yellow Bird" (Alan Bergman, Marilyn Keith, Norman Luboff)

Side two
 "Unchained Melody" (Alex North, Hy Zaret)
 "Half as Much" (Curley Williams)
 "More (Theme from Mondo Cane)" (Riz Ortolani, Nino Oliviero, Norman Newell)
 "Possum Song" (John Gary)
 "Somewhere Along the Way" (Kurt Adams, Sammy Gallop)
 "Ebb Tide" (Carl Sigman, Robert Maxwell)

References

External links
Catch a Rising Star at AllMusic

1963 debut albums
RCA Victor albums
Albums arranged by Marty Gold
Albums conducted by Marty Gold
Albums produced by Hugo & Luigi